The 1999–2000 season was Montpellier Hérault Sport Club's 81st season in existence and the club's 13th consecutive season in the top flight of French football. In addition to the domestic league, Montpellier participated in this season's edition of the Coupe de France. The season covered the period from 1 July 1999 to 30 June 2000.

Competitions

Overview

French Division 1

League table

Results summary

Results by round

Matches

Source:

Coupe de France

Coupe de la Ligue

UEFA Cup

First round

Second round

UEFA Intertoto Cup

References

External links

Montpellier HSC seasons
Montpellier HSC